Fuladshahr (also Romanized as Fūlādshahr and Fūlād Shahr; formerly, Pūlād Shahr and Āryā Shahr) meaning "steel city" is a city and capital in the Fuladshahr District of Lenjan County, Isfahan Province, Iran. At the 2006 census, its population was 55,496, in 13,822 families.

It was built during the Shah of Iran period, and was home to the mostly Russian and other employees of the Zob Ahan factory, which is located near the city. The world's third biggest cement factory at the time, the Siman Sepahan Diziche or Siman Arya diziche as it was called before the Iranian revolution, is also located near the city.

Sports

Fuladshahr is home to Foolad Shahr Stadium, which is the permanent home of Zob Ahan.

References

Populated places in Lenjan County
Cities in Isfahan Province